Taher Gurab (also Romanized as Ţāher Gūrāb; also known as Tāhir Gurāb and Takhergurab) is a village in Taher Gurab Rural District, in the Central District of Sowme'eh Sara County, Gilan Province, Iran. At the 2006 census, its population was 1,311, in 367 families.

References 

Populated places in Sowme'eh Sara County